Scott Lipsky and David Martin were the defending champions but decided not to participate.
Martin Emmrich and Andreas Siljeström won the title, defeating Kenny de Schepper and Édouard Roger-Vasselin in the final.

Seeds

Draw

Draw

References
 Main Draw

Open de Rennes - Doubles
2011 Doubles